Songs I've Sung on the Perry Como Show is an album from Caterina Valente. It is released in the United States and is today known as Valente on TV.

Track listing

Side 1
 Make Someone Happy
 You're Following Me
 More Than Likely
 Couci Couca
 Corcovado
 Blue Moon

Side 2
 Falling in Love with Love
 Stella by Starlight
 To Be a Performer
 Yours
 Dimelo en Septiembre
 Whispering

Sources

Caterina Valente albums
1964 albums
FFRR Records albums
Italian-language albums
London Records albums